Lophosaurus is a genus of arboreal agamid lizards from Australia and Melanesia.

Species
, Lophosaurus contains the following three species:

Lophosaurus boydii (Macleay, 1884) – Boyd's forest dragon
Lophosaurus dilophus (A.M.C. Duméril & Bibron, 1837) – Indonesian forest dragon
Lophosaurus spinipes (A.M.C. Duméril & A.H.A. Duméril, 1851) – southern forest dragon, southern angle-headed dragon

Nota bene: A binomial authority in parentheses indicates that the species was originally described in a genus other than Lophosaurus.

References

Further reading
Peters W. 1867. "Über Flederthiere ... und Amphibien ( Hypsilurus ... )". Monatsberichte der Königlich-Preussischen Akademie der Wissenschaften zu Berlin 1867: 703-712. (Hypsilurus, new subgenus, pp. 707–708). (in German).

 
Lizard genera
Agamid lizards of Australia
Reptiles of Oceania
Taxa named by Leopold Fitzinger